The Angrez 2 is a 2015 Indian slapstick comedy film written and directed by Kuntaa Nikkil. It is a sequel to his 2005 film The Angrez. Actors Mast Ali and Dheer Charan Srivastav reprise their roles from the earlier film.

Plot
In a sequel to The Angrez, the events brought out in that first film continue. The Angrez (Pranai and Peter) is being chased by the Hyderabadi old city guys to take revenge of Ismail Bhai. Hyderabadi guys kidnap one of the foreign ladies instead of Pranai (Kuntaa Nikkil) and how events proceed forms the rest of the story of the movie.

Cast
The NRIs (Good Guys)
 Kunta Nikkil as Pranai Newell
 Izeqiel McCoy as Peter Wilson (credited as Zeq McCoy)

The Old City Gang (Bad Guys)
 Mast Ali as Salim Pheku
 Dheer Charan Srivastav as Ismail Bhai
 Azam as Azam
 Chaush as Chaush
 Munna as Dubai Pasha
 Logo as Lobo

Supporting characters
 Jeevan Shekhar Reddy as Prasad
 Tanuja as Melody
 Anu Varma as Sulochana
 Raghu Karumanchi as Ramesh, Pranai's cousin brother
 Venu as Charminar Anna

Release
The film was released in Hyderabad, India on 8 May 2015.

Music
Music was composed by Mallinath.

References

External links
 The Angrez 2 at the Internet Movie Database

2015 films
2015 comedy films
2010s Hindi-language films
Films set in Hyderabad, India
2010s Urdu-language films
2010s Telugu-language films
2010s English-language films
Indian comedy films
2015 multilingual films
Indian multilingual films
English-language Indian films